Yuxarı Velik (also, Yuxarı Vılık, Velik, and Yukhary Velik) is a village and municipality in the Lerik Rayon of Azerbaijan.  It has a population of 299.  The municipality consists of the villages of Yuxarı Velik and Hübi.

References 

Populated places in Lerik District